The 2023 Norfolk State Spartans football team will represent Norfolk State University as a member of the Mid-Eastern Athletic Conference (MEAC) during the 2023 NCAA Division I FCS football season. The Spartans are led by third-year head coach Dawson Odums and play home games at William "Dick" Price Stadium in Norfolk, Virginia.

Previous season

The Spartans finished the 2022 season with a record of 2–9, 2–3 MEAC play to finish in a tie for third place in the MEAC.

Schedule

References

Norfolk State
Norfolk State Spartans football seasons
Norfolk State Spartans football